Earth, Wind & Fire: Live by Request is a DVD released by the band Earth, Wind & Fire on February 26, 2002 on Sony Music of the band's performance on the A&E network's live concert series Live by Request. The recording was made on July 17, 1999.

Set list
"Shining Star"
"Fantasy"
"Let's Groove"
"Devotion"
"September"
"Sing a Song"
"Reasons"
"Boogie Wonderland"
"That's the Way of the World"
"Mighty Mighty"
"Got to Get You into My Life"
"After the Love Has Gone"
"Getaway"
"In the Stone"
"I'll Write a Song for You"
"Serpentine Fire"
"Keep Your Head to the Sky" (bonus section)

References

Earth, Wind & Fire video albums
2002 video albums
Live video albums
2002 live albums